Castleblakeney, historically Gallagh, is a village in County Galway, Ireland. It is at the crossroads of the R359 and R339 regional roads, 5km south of the town of Mountbellew.

See also
List of towns and villages in Ireland

References

Towns and villages in County Galway